Ruth Young may refer to:

 Ruth Comfort Mitchell Young (1882–1954), American author and playwright
 Ruth Forbes Young (1903–1998), member of the Forbes family and philanthropist
Ruth Young (singer), American jazz singer
Ruth Young (archaeologist), professor of archaeology at the University of Leicester